The Mil Mi-46 is a projected passenger/cargo/flying crane aircraft first announced in 1992. The aircraft was split into two versions: Mi-46T and Mi-46K. The Mi-46T was the passenger/cargo transport version, just half the weight of the Mi-26, fit to replace the aging Mi-6. The Mi-46K was the flying crane version fit to replace the Mi-10K. D-21SV engine PD-12V turboshaft.However, its development is hindered by the lack of an engine, as until now there is no suitable engine for this helicopter. The Mi-46 future heavy lift helicopter requires a turboshaft engine, and one with enough power is not available either in Russia or abroad.

References

1990s Soviet and Russian cargo aircraft
Mil aircraft
1990s Soviet and Russian helicopters